Rosemary's Daughter is a 1976 West German sex comedy film directed by Rolf Thiele and starring Lillian Müller, Béla Ernyey, and Werner Pochath. It is based on the story of Rosemarie Nitribitt, which Thiele had already treated more seriously in the 1958 drama Rosemary.

Cast

References

External links

West German films
1970s sex comedy films
German sex comedy films
Films directed by Rolf Thiele
Constantin Film films
1970s German-language films
1970s German films